The Lloyds Bank coprolite is a large coprolite, or fossilised specimen of human faeces, recovered by the York Archaeological Trust while excavating the Viking settlement of Jórvík (present-day York) in northern England.

Description
Analysis of the stool has indicated that its producer subsisted largely on meat and bread whilst the presence of several hundred parasitic eggs suggests they were riddled with intestinal worms. In 1991, Andrew Jones, a York Archaeological Trust employee and palaeoscatologist, made international news with his appraisal of the item for insurance purposes: "This is the most exciting piece of excrement I've ever seen ... In its own way, it's as irreplaceable as the Crown Jewels".
The layers that covered the coprolite were moist and peaty. The archaeologists also preserved timber, textiles and leather from the site.

Display
The specimen was put on display at the Archaeological Resource Centre, an outreach and education centre run by the York Archaeological Trust. In 2003, the coprolite broke into three pieces after being dropped while being exhibited to a party of visitors, and efforts were undertaken to reconstruct it. It has been displayed at Jorvik Viking Centre since 2008.

References

Further reading

External links

 Bone: The Man Behind the Lloyds Bank Turd - Video discussing the discovery and analysis of the coprolite
 

Anglo-Norse England
Collections of the York Archaeological Trust
Feces
History of North Yorkshire
Archaeology of England
Lloyds Banking Group
1972 in England
1972 archaeological discoveries